The Fox River Belt is a  long and  to  wide Paleoproterozoic geologic feature located in northern Manitoba, Canada. It consists of sedimentary and mafic/ultramafic igneous rocks.

References

Archean geology
Geology of Manitoba
Proterozoic North America